Victor Robert William Myles (November 12, 1914 – August 21, 1983) was a Canadian professional ice hockey player who played 45 games in the National Hockey League for the New York Rangers.

He died in Moose Jaw, Saskatchewan in 1983 and is buried at Rosedale Cemetery.

References

External links

1914 births
1983 deaths
Canadian ice hockey defencemen
Ice hockey people from Saskatchewan
New York Rangers players